Gregory James Kyllo is a Canadian politician, who was elected to the Legislative Assembly of British Columbia in the 2013 provincial election, and was re-elected in 2017 and 2020.  He represents the electoral district of Shuswap as a member of the British Columbia Liberal Party.

Before entering politics at the provincial level, Kyllo served at the president and CEO of Twin Anchors Marine and TA Structures, based in Sicamous, British Columbia. He first became involved in politics by serving as deputy mayor of Sicamous, as well as councillor and member of the finance committee.

Electoral record

References

British Columbia Liberal Party MLAs
Living people
1968 births
People from Fort St. John, British Columbia
21st-century Canadian politicians